Captain Henry Marley Burton  (1821–1880) was a British architect.

Family
He was the eldest illegitimate son of the gunpowder manufacturer William Ford Burton (1784 – 1856) and the grandson of the pre-eminent London property developer James Burton, and the nephew of the architect Decimus Burton.
Henry Marley had one brother, William Warwick Burton (d. 21 October 1861). William Warwick Burton lived at Lincoln's Inn Fields, where he was articled as a solicitor to his uncle, Septimus Burton (27 July 1794 – 25 November 1842) of Lincoln's Inn. William Warwick Burton had three children, William Edgar Burton, Edmund Burton, and Jessy Burton, each of whom were left property in the will of their uncle, Decimus, who never married and died without issue.

Henry Marley Burton was baptized as Henry Marley on 12 Dec 1821: at his baptism, he was claimed to be the son of William Marley and Sally Marley, London neighbours of the Burtons.

Architect
Henry Marley Burton trained in the office of his uncle, Decimus Burton, by whom he was subsequently employed as an assistant. Henry Marley succeeded to Decimus's practice on Decimus's retirement in 1869. In 1866, Henry Marley was commissioned by John George Dodson, 1st Baron Monk Bretton to design a mansion at Coneyborough. His uncle Decimus had designed Bineham in Chailey for Dodson's brother-in-law John George Blencowe. The construction of additions to the Clubhouse of the Oriental Club that were designed by Decimus Burton, in 1853, was superintended, when eventually commenced, in 1871, by his nephew Henry Marley Burton.

Henry Marley, together with his uncle Decimus, trained the architect Edward John May FRIBA.

Personal life
Henry Marley Burton was a Captain in the Queen's (Westminster) Rifle Corps.

Henry Marley's residence was 14 Spring Gardens, St James's. Henry Marley had at least one son, Edgar Burton, who became an architect. Edgar Burton's daughter, Adelaide Veronica Elizabeth Burton, was abortively married, at St. George's, Hanover Square, to Leopold Albu, of 4 Hamilton Place, Mayfair, the brother of Sir George Albu, between 19 August 1901 and 1915.

Henry Marley Burton died in 1880.

Further reading

References

19th-century English architects
Greek Revival architects
Architects from London
Georgian architecture
Fellows of the Royal Institute of British Architects
Queen's Westminsters officers